Justin Tuveri (May 13, 1898 – October 5, 2007) was, at age 109, one of the last Italian veterans of the First World War and a French citizen at the time of his death.

Tuveri was born Giustino Tuveri in Collinas, on the island of Sardinia. He was drafted in 1917, and fought in several campaigns, including Sassari.

Due to the rise of Benito Mussolini and the Fascists, Tuveri moved to France in 1920, becoming a French citizen in 1940.

He died in Saint-Tropez, France.

References

External links
 http://www.lemonde.fr/web/article/0,1-0,36-708425,0.html 
 http://dersdesders.free.fr/bio_veterans/tuveri.html 
 http://www.boston.com/news/globe/obituaries/articles/2007/10/12/justin_tuveri_at_109_fought_for_italy_during_world_war_i/

1898 births
2007 deaths
French centenarians
Men centenarians
Italian emigrants to France
French military personnel of World War I
French people of Sardinian descent